Caladenia patersonii is a plant in the orchid family Orchidaceae and is native to Victoria and Tasmania. It is a ground orchid with a single hairy leaf and one or two creamy-white, yellowish or pink flowers.

Description
The leaf often has red to purple blotches near its base. The sepals and petals have brown or reddish-brown, densely glandular, thread-like tips. Flowering occurs from September to November and is more prolific after fire.

Taxonomy and naming
Caladenia patersonii was first formally described in 1810 by Robert Brown and the description was published in ''Prodromus florae Novae Hollandiae.

Distribution and habitat
Paterson's spider orchid is found mostly in eastern coastal Victoria and northern Tasmania where it grows in heath and heathy woodland.

Conservation
Caladenia patersonii is listed as "vulnerable" in Tasmania under the Threatened Species Protection Act 1995.

References 

patersonii
Plants described in 1810
Endemic orchids of Australia
Orchids of Victoria (Australia)
Orchids of Tasmania
Taxa named by Robert Brown (botanist, born 1773)